The 2017 K3 League Basic was the first season of the K3 League Basic. The top 12 teams from 2016 K3 League remained in the league renamed 2017 K3 League Advanced, and the remaining 8 teams were relegated to this new league. Yeonggwang FC withdrew this season, with two new teams Busan FC and Pyeongtaek G-SMATT FC joining.

Competition format
The 2017 season ran from March through to October. The 9 teams competed in a single division. Each team played each other home and away for a total of 16 games. After the regular season, the top team and the winner of the playoff between 2nd-5th teams qualified for the 2018 K3 League Advanced.

Clubs

Matches 1–20

League table

Playoffs

See also
 2017 Korean FA Cup
 2017 K League Classic
 2017 K League Challenge
 2017 Korea National League

References

2017 in South Korean football